Wallface Mountain is a mountain located in Essex County, New York. 
The mountain is named after the cliff on its southeastern side.
Wallface is flanked to the west by MacNaughton Mountain, and faces Mount Marshall to the southeast across Indian Pass.

The southeast and west sides of Wallface Mountain drain into the southern Indian Pass Brook, thence into Henderson Lake, the source of the Hudson River, which drains into New York Bay.
The northern slopes of Wallface Mountain drain into the northern Indian Pass Brook, thence into the West Branch of the Ausable River, into Lake Champlain, thence into Canada's Richelieu River, the Saint Lawrence River, and into the Gulf of Saint Lawrence.

Wallface Mountain is within the High Peaks Wilderness Area of New York's Adirondack Park.

See also 
 List of mountains in New York

Notes

External links 
  Peakbagger.com: Wallface Mountain
 

Mountains of Essex County, New York
Mountains of New York (state)